Camp B'nai Brith of Ottawa, also known as CBB of Ottawa, is a Jewish summer camp north-west of Ottawa, near Quyon, Quebec. The camp draws campers and staff from across Canada, the United States, Europe and Israel.

History
Lodge no. 885 of B'nai Brith Canada founded the Ottawa Jewish Boy Scouts Camp in 1935, sponsoring forty underprivileged local Jewish boy scouts who wished to attend summer camp. The camp, which would become Camp B'nai Brith of Ottawa, was originally located in Dubrobin near Fitzroy Harbour, serving the Jewish communities of Ottawa, Toronto, and Montreal. While sponsored by the Lodge, the camp was initially run under the strict supervision of the District Boy Scouts Association.

Beginning in 1938, Camp B'nai Brith set aside two weeks for a girls camp at the conclusion of the boys' four week camp. The camp moved its current site on the shore of the Ottawa River in Quyon, Quebec in 1946.

Notable alumni
 Leonard Cohen, poet and singer-songwriter
 Noah Cantor, football player
 Boris Cherniak, hypnotist
 Steven Dubinsky, hockey player
 Saul Rubinek, actor and director

See also
 Camp B'nai Brith of Montreal

References

1935 establishments in Quebec
Jewish organizations based in Canada
Jewish summer camps in Canada
Jews and Judaism in Ottawa
Jews and Judaism in Ontario
Jewish organizations established in 1935
Summer camps in Canada
B'nai B'rith